The Munster Senior Cup is an association football cup competition organized by the Munster Football Association. Entrants include League of Ireland clubs such as Cork City, Cobh Ramblers and Waterford who are affiliated to the MFA, as well as clubs from the Munster Senior League.

History
Like the Munster Football Association itself, the Munster Senior Cup was originally inaugurated in 1901. It was initially dominated by British Army regimental teams. Among the early winners were the Royal Engineers, one of the pioneering teams of association football in England. They had played in the very first FA Cup Final in 1871–72 before winning it for the first time in 1875. During the First World War/Irish War of Independence era there were no competitions, but the cup was revived in 1922–23. Since 1922 clubs playing in the League of Ireland have dominated the winners' list and the competitions two most successful clubs have been Cork City and Waterford. However, in recent times Munster Senior League clubs have been regular finalists and in 2013–14 Douglas Hall were winners.

List of finals

List of winners by club

Notes
 This was not the same Cork Celtic that later played in the League of Ireland.
 Although the competition was played for in 1906–07, 1939–40, and 1957–58, no finals were played.
 Apart from the current club named Cork City, two earlier clubs named Cork City have also been finalists.
 Albert Rovers also won the cup playing as Cork Alberts and Cork United. An earlier club also named Cork United were finalists and winners during the 1940s.

References

5
Association football in Munster
1901 establishments in Ireland
Sports competitions in Munster